Tatiana Ouliankina (Tatyana Ulyankina; born 1970) is a Russian actress, best known for her work in Irish film and television.

Filmography
 Paths to Free dom (TV, 2000) as Natalya Ivanova (3 episodes)
 The Clinic (TV, 2003) as Natalia Riabushkin (6 episodes)
 Proof (2004) as Club Hostess (1 episode)
 Short Order (2005) as Stefani
 Fair City (TV, 2003–07) as Lana Borodin Dowling
 Belonging to Laura (TV film, 2009) as Sascha
 Parked (2010) as Aqua Aerobics Instructor
A Date for Mad Mary as Oksana

Awards
Ouliankina has been nominated for two Irish Film & Television Awards: in 2005 as Best Supporting Actress (Film) for Short Order; and in 2010 as Best Supporting Actress (TV) for Belonging to Laura, a TV adaptation of Lady Windermere's Fan.

References

External links
 
 Personal webpage
 Page at Backstage talent agency

1970 births
Living people
Actresses from Moscow
Russian expatriates in Ireland